Rachel Zuntz (1787–1874), was a German businessperson.  She founded the famous coffee company A. Zuntz sel. Wwe. in Bonn in 1837, which expanded all over Germany and Belgium and provided coffee for the Imperial German court.

References

1787 births
1874 deaths
19th-century German businesswomen
19th-century German businesspeople
19th-century Jews